Norio Torimoto (born 1948 in Japan) is one of the best-known representatives of origami art. Since 1971, he has been represented in museums, exhibitions and participated in other events where Japanese culture has been the focus. Torimoto now lives in Sweden.

Recognition 
Torimoto was recognized for his art in 1991 at Nippon Origami Association World Exhibition. Torimoto was appointed Origami Master by Nippon Origami Association, one of nine in the world, on New Years Day, 2000. Torimoto has been involved in origami projects around the world in countries like the US, Hungary, China, Poland, Latvia, Italy, Germany and Sweden.

Professional accomplishments 
In 1987, Torimoto was commissioned to create an origami panda, symbol of World Wildlife Foundation (WWF). He had the honor to present the panda to his majesty, King Carl XVI Gustaf of Sweden.

Extremely interested in mathematics, Torimoto lectures at The Royal Institute of Technology in Stockholm, several universities in Japan, Denmark, and the UK, with topics like “Origami – Geometric solution as visual tactile perception”. Torimoto also spends his days teaching both teachers and young kids advanced mathematics through his origami.

He designed the covert art for 2009 Eniro telephone catalogs in Sweden. Among his origami creations you will find figures like Pippi Longstocking, Björn Borg, Boris Yeltsin, Olof Palme, as well as the former Swedish Prime Minister Göran Persson.

With Yukiko Duke, he coauthored Origami: a complete step-by-step guide to making animals, flowers, planes, boats, and more, Skyhorse Publishing 2012 .

References

External links
Panorama radio
Living Swedish blog in Japanese
The Royal Dramatic Theatre Dramaten in Swedish
Form & Fanatasi Origami Book 2011
Eniro Swedish Yellow Pages cover 2009

Origami artists
Academic staff of the KTH Royal Institute of Technology
1948 births
Living people